Lele is an East Manus language of the Austronesian language family spoken in the northeastern part of Manus Island, New Guinea. It has an SVO word order.

References

External links 
 Kaipuleohone's Robert Blust collection includes written materials from Lele

Manus languages
Languages of Manus Province
Subject–verb–object languages